Slate Creek is a creek located in the Omineca Country region of British Columbia.  This creek is a tributary of the Manson River and flows into that river from the west.  Slate Creek was discovered in 1871.  The creek has been mined using wing-damming and hand-mining.

References

External links
 

Rivers of British Columbia
Cassiar Land District